The Central America-4 passport (also called the Central American passport) is a common-design passport issued by the Central America-4 Border Control Agreement member states (El Salvador, Guatemala, Honduras, and Nicaragua). Although the design had been in use by Nicaragua and El Salvador since the mid-1990s, it became the norm for the CA-4 in January 2006. The main features are the navy blue cover with the words "Centroamérica" and a map of Central America, with the territory of the issuing country highlighted in gold (in place of the individual nations' coats of arms). Costa Rica, not a C-4 Agreement member, also uses a passport with the inscription "América Central", retained from the Federal Republic of Central America and included in its coat of arms.

See also

Central America-4 Border Control Agreement
Central American Integration System
 Visa policy of El Salvador
 Visa policy of Guatemala
 Visa policy of Honduras
 Visa policy of Nicaragua

Passports
Government of El Salvador
Government of Guatemala
Government of Honduras
Government of Nicaragua
Central America-4 Border Control Agreement